NeuroMatrix is a digital signal processor (DSP) series developed by NTC Module. The DSP has a VLIW/SIMD architecture. It consists of a 32-bit RISC core and a 64-bit vector co-processor. The vector co-processor supports vector operations with elements of variable bit length (US Pat. 6539368 B1) and is optimized to support the implementation of artificial neural networks. From this derives the name NeuroMatrix Core (NMC). Newer devices contain multiple DSP cores and additional ARM or PowerPC 470 cores.

Overview

Details

L1879VM1
 
 start of development in 1996, start of production in 1999 at Samsung

1879VM2
 
 manufactured at Fujitsu

1879VM3
 
 manufactured at Fujitsu

1879VM5Ya

 
 manufactured at Fujitsu Japan

1879VM6Ya
 
 manufactured at GlobalFoundries Malaysia

1879VM8Ya
 
 system-on-a-chip (SoC) containing 4 computing clusters, each consisting of one ARM Cortex-A5 core and four NMC4 DSP cores, plus one stand-alone ARM Cortex-A5 core
 manufactured at TSMC ?

1879VYa1Ya
 
 system-on-a-chip (SoC) for software-defined radios, including four 12-bit analog-to-digital converters with 82MSamples/s and hardware blocks implementing a digital direct-conversion receiver

K1879KhB1Ya
 , also romanized as K1879XB1Ya
 manufactured at Fujitsu
 system-on-a-chip (SoC) for set-top boxes where the NMC core is used as an audio processor

1879KhK1Ya
 , also romanized as 1879XK1Ya
 system-on-a-chip (SoC) for software-defined radios, including four 12-bit analog-to-digital converters with 85MSamples/s and hardware blocks implementing a digital direct-conversion receiver

K1888VS018
 
 system-on-a-chip (SoC) for software-defined radios, including four 10-bit analog-to-digital converters with 90MSamples/s, as well as CAN bus, I²C, SPI, Ethernet

1888VS048
 
 system-on-a-chip (SoC) for connecting a PCI Express 2.0 host interface to 4x Gigabit Ethernet (with RFC 4175 support), ARINC 429, as well as CAN bus, I²C, SPI

1888VS058
 
 system-on-a-chip (SoC) for radar systems with dedicated interfaces for high-speed analog-to-digital converters and digital-to-analog converters

1888TKh018
 
 system-on-a-chip (SoC) for aircraft onboard video and multimedia processing systems, including ARINC 818 and SpaceWire interfaces as well as hardware encoder and decoder for H.264 video

1888VM018
 
 rad-hard system-on-a-chip (SoC) including SpaceWire, Ethernet, SPI, SDIO interfaces

External links 
 NTC Module products

References 

Digital signal processors